In electronics, electric power and telecommunication, coupling is the transfer of electrical energy from one circuit to another, or between parts of a circuit. Coupling can be deliberate as part of the function of the circuit, or it may be undesirable, for instance due to coupling to stray fields.  For example, energy is transferred from a power source to an electrical load by means of conductive coupling, which may be either resistive or direct coupling. An AC potential may be transferred from one circuit segment to another having a DC potential by use of a capacitor. Electrical energy may be transferred from one circuit segment to another segment with different impedance by use of a transformer; this is known as impedance matching. These are examples of electrostatic and electrodynamic inductive coupling.

Types

Electrical conduction:
 Direct coupling, also called conductive coupling and galvanic coupling
 Resistive conduction
 Atmospheric plasma channel coupling

Electromagnetic induction:
 Electrodynamic induction — commonly called inductive coupling, also magnetic coupling
 Capacitive coupling
 Evanescent wave coupling

Electromagnetic radiation:
 Radio waves — Wireless telecommunications.
 Electromagnetic interference (EMI) — Sometimes called radio frequency interference (RFI), is unwanted coupling. Electromagnetic compatibility (EMC) requires techniques to avoid such unwanted coupling, such as electromagnetic shielding.
 Microwave power transmission

Other kinds of energy coupling:
 Acoustic coupler

See also
Antenna noise temperature
Coupling loss
Aperture-to-medium coupling loss
Coupling coefficient of resonators
Directional coupler
Equilibrium length
Fiber-optic coupling
Loading coil
Shield
List of electronics topics
AC Coupling
Impedance matching
Impedance bridging
Decoupling
Crosstalk
Wireless power transfer

References

Communication circuits
Electromagnetic compatibility
Electronics